The Gelora Bung Karno Aquatic Stadium is an aquatics stadium in the Gelora Bung Karno Sports Complex in Gelora, Central Jakarta, Indonesia. It has a capacity of 7,800. It is used mostly for swimming and water polo events. The stadium was used during the 2018 Asian Games and Asian Para Games.

References

External links
 Profile on GBK Sports Complex official website

Sports venues in Indonesia
Sports venues in Jakarta
Swimming venues in Indonesia
Swimming venues in Jakarta
Sports venues completed in 1962
Venues of the 1962 Asian Games
Venues of the 2018 Asian Games
Asian Games artistic swimming venues
Asian Games diving venues
Asian Games swimming venues
Asian Games water polo venues